John 'Spud' Murphy (6 December 1942 – 23 April 2020) was a Scottish footballer who played his entire senior career with Ayr United.

A full-back, Murphy made a club record 459 Scottish Football League appearances for 'The Honest Men' from 1963 to 1978 and was inducted to the club's Hall of Fame in 2007.

Murphy died on 23 April 2020, aged 77, after a long illness.

References

External links
London Hearts opposition player profile

Ayr United F.C. players
1942 births
2020 deaths
Scottish footballers
Sportspeople from Wishaw
Footballers from East Ayrshire
Association football fullbacks
Scottish Football League players
Darvel F.C. players
Scottish Junior Football Association players
Aberdeen F.C. non-playing staff
Footballers from North Lanarkshire